Dryoctenes scrupulosus is a species of beetle in the family Cerambycidae, the only species in the genus Dryoctenes.

References

Acanthoderini